Apoy sa Langit (International title: Broken Promise / ) is a 2022 Philippine television drama romance series broadcast by GMA Network. Directed by Laurice Guillen, it stars Maricel Laxa. It premiered on May 2, 2022 on the network's Afternoon Prime and Sabado Star Power sa Hapon line up replacing Prima Donnas. The series concluded on September 3, 2022 with a total of 105 episodes. It was replaced by Abot-Kamay na Pangarap in its timeslot.

Cast and characters
Lead cast
 Maricel Laxa as Gemma Monastrial / Gemma Hidalgo

Supporting cast
 Zoren Legaspi as Cesar Monastrial
 Mikee Quintos as Ning Hidalgo
 Lianne Valentin as Stella Fernandez
 Mariz Ricketts as Blessie Atienza
 Carlos Siguion-Reyna as Edong Tayag
 Dave Bornea as Anthony "Tony" Zulueta
 Coleen Paz as Patring Benipayo
 Celine Fajardo as Iyah Legarda
 Patricia Ismael as Lucy Fuerte
 Mio Maranan as Toto Pancho

Guest cast
 Ramon Christopher as Rey Hidalgo
 Jen Rosendahl as Rona de Leon

Episodes
<onlyinclude>
<onlyinclude>

References

External links
 
 

2022 Philippine television series debuts
2022 Philippine television series endings
Filipino-language television shows
GMA Network drama series
Philippine romance television series
Television shows set in the Philippines